The Winning Side is the first in the series of Time Hunter novellas and features the characters Honoré Lechasseur and Emily Blandish from Daniel O'Mahony's Doctor Who novella The Cabinet of Light. It is written by Lance Parkin, author of several Doctor Who spin-offs.

The novella is also available in a limited edition hardback, signed by the author

(The series is not formally connected to the Whoniverse.)

Synopsis
Emily Blandish has been murdered by an unknown assailant, but when Honoré Lechasseur turns up to see the body, he is surprised to be met by... Emily Blandish. They soon find themselves embroiled in a revolutionary plot stretching into their own futures, with the freedom of the entire world at stake.

Plot

Sometime after the events of The Cabinet of Light, Honoré  has come to terms with his time sensitive ability, and is even using it to his advantage: spying on a man named Brown who his wife suspects is having an affair. The investigation is curtailed as Honoré is called to identify the murdered body of his friend Emily Blandish. As he does, though, Emily herself turns up alive and well.

As they try to investigate this strange paradox, they are caught in a shootout in the street between a plainclothes policeman and a mysterious stranger. As Honoré wonders where the stranger came from, Emily touches his arm thinking the same thing... and the two of them suddenly find themselves in a muddy field in the middle of nowhere. As they try to work out where they are, a tank trundles down the road, and Honoré finds himself seeing it as if it were both there, and not there.

They head to a barn to hide, and find a newspaper that shows they are thirty years in their own future. Leaving Honoré to try to come to terms with this, Emily heads into the village to find more information but is quickly identified as a stranger and taken for interrogation. The interrogator is a time sensitive named Radford, who discovers that he can travel in time if he is touching Emily and they are concentrating on the same thing. Radford forces Emily to travel back with him to 1949, so that he might take the actions that ensure that his future comes to pass. Once he has done this, he intends to kill Emily; leaving her body for Honoré to be called to identify.

However, knowing her future, Emily fights back and attacks Radford. As she overpowers him, she thinks of Honoré, and the two of them travel back to the future and rejoin Honoré. Emily and Honoré return to 1949, leaving Radford in his alternative future. As he was unable to carry out the required actions in 1949, his future does not come to pass and the 1980s occur as history says that they did. Honoré and Emily, in the meantime, have to come to terms with their remarkable ability to travel in time.

Emily's ability as a "Time Channeller" — the "pilot" that allows her and Honoré to travel in time — was not mentioned in The Cabinet of Light. The author of that novella, Daniel O'Mahony, has stated on onlines forums that this is because the concept was introduced by Telos after the novella had been published to prevent the Time Hunter series from being stuck in the 1950s.

Allusions to Orwell's 1984

Although never explicitly mentioned in the text, the alternative future that Emily and Honoré visit in the novella is the 1984 of George Orwell's social allegory. The only indication of this — aside from the cover — is Radford's ability to comprehend the concept of paradoxes without confusion because they so resemble the concept of doublethink. In a fictional introduction to The Albino's Dancer on his website,  Dale Smith suggests that Honoré inspired Orwell to write 1984 by telling him the story of The Winning Side during the Spanish Civil War. The chief villain of the book was apparently also named after the director of the 1984 film version of Nineteen Eighty-Four, Michael Radford.

Audiobook

In September 2008, Telos announced that a fan production company, Fantom Films, had been licensed to produce audiobook readings of the Time Hunter novellas for release on CD and as online downloads.  The Winning Side, read by former Doctor Who actor Louise Jameson, is the second in the series and was released in November 2008.

External links
 Telos Publishing - The Winning Side
 The Winning Side audiobook

Reviews
 Bondegezou's review

Time Hunter
2003 British novels
Novels by Lance Parkin
British science fiction novels
Telos Publishing books